The Windward Performance SparrowHawk is an American mid-wing, single-seat glider that was designed and produced by Windward Performance. It first flew in 2002.

Since 2016 the aircraft has been no longer advertised as available by the manufacturer.

Design and development
The sailplane achieves this by utilizing a structure that is predominantly made from carbon-fiber-reinforced polymer.

The SparrowHawk's multi-tapered,  span wing employs five different airfoils and has an aspect ratio of 18.6:1. The wing features Schempp-Hirth style spoilers on the top surface. The landing gear is a fixed monowheel gear with an auxiliary tail wheel. The glider is finished with a two part polyurethane paint. The aircraft can be launched by auto-tow, winch-launch, or aero-tow by both light aircraft and ultralight aircraft. Aerobatics are not recommended.

The SparrowHawk achieves a best glide ratio of 36:1 and a minimum sink rate of 119 ft/min (0.60 m/s).

Specifications (SparrowHawk)

See also

References

External links
Official website archives on Archive.org

2000s United States sailplanes
Aircraft first flown in 2002